Ashutosh Mohunta (25 February 1953 – 22 September 2020) was an Indian judge. He was Acting Chief Justice of Punjab and Haryana High Court in 2014. He was a judge on the Punjab and Haryana High Court from 2001 to 2010, and once more from 2014 until 2015. Mohunta served on the Andhra Pradesh High Court from 2010 to 2014. He was Member of Punjab State Human Rights Commission from 2016 until his death.

Career
Mohunta was born on 25 February 1953, in Sirsa, East Punjab, India (now in Haryana, India). In 1976 he obtained his Bachelor of Laws degree from the University of Delhi. He enrolled as advocate in 1977 in the Punjab and Haryana High Court and started practicing under his father Sushil Chand Mohunta, who at that point was the Advocate General of Haryana.
 
Mohunta became judge of the Punjab and Haryana High Court on 2 July 2001. He transferred to Andhra Pradesh High Court and assumed charge on 28 October 2010. He returned to the Punjab and Haryana High Court for health reasons on 26 June 2014. He took over as Acting Chief Justice of the Punjab and Haryana High Court on 26 July 2014 and remained in this position until 15 December 2014. He retired on 24 February 2015.

On 23 September 2016 he was appointed Member of Punjab State Human Rights Commission.

Death
Mohunta died on 22 September 2020, due to COVID-19 during the COVID-19 pandemic in India at a hospital in Mohali.

References

1953 births
2020 deaths
Chief Justices of the Punjab and Haryana High Court
Deaths from the COVID-19 pandemic in India
Judges of the Andhra Pradesh High Court
Judges of the Punjab and Haryana High Court
Delhi University alumni
People from Sirsa district